Tawjihi or Al-Tawjeehi (امتحان شهادة الدراسة الثانوية العامة) is the General Secondary Education Certificate Examination in Jordan and Palestine. It is the last stage of school education. To sit for the exam, students are required to finish 2 years of pre-school education, 10 years of basic education, and 2 years of secondary academic or vocational education (Tawjihi year). Subjects in the exam include Arabic, English, Mathematics, Physics, Biology, Chemistry, Computer Science, Geology, Civil Studies and Islamic studies (unless Christian).

Only those who pass the exam with a good mark may apply to proceed to university. For example, to be accepted to study medicine you must take the scientific stream in the last 2 years of the secondary education and get a mark not less than 85 degrees out of 100 in the Tawjihi exam.

Jordanian Tawjihi Equivalency 
Foreign secondary education programs such as GCE/IGCSE/GCSE, SATs, and International Baccalaureate require to have Tawjihi-equivalency, so that the student could later work in Jordan or proceed to a higher education in Jordan.

Upon graduation, the ministry of Higher Education transforms the Grades/Marks of these foreign educational programs, into the same marks used in grading Tawjihi students. However, even after the equivalency transformation, non-Tawjihi graduates are not allowed to compete with Tawjihi graduates for public university places. For non-Tawjihi graduates, there is a set quota of 5% of places. However, graduates holding a foreign education program are allowed to pay the same fees as Tawjihi graduates if they are citizens, granted they completed the equivalency.

Regarding the system used to transform exam results of foreign education programs into the Tawjihi scale, which is a percentage out of 100, some see the system is fair and in fact over lenient with non-Tawjihi graduates, while others see it as unfair. Below is a summary of the requirements of the Ministry of education to receive an equivalency to the Jordanian Tawjihi.

GCE/IGCSE/GCSE equivalency 
General conditions:
You should provide the Ministry with a proof that you have completed 12 years of schooling.
You must pass six O-levels and or IGCSE/GCSE subjects and two A-level subjects. Passing grades are as follows:
O-level/IGCSE/GCSE :  A, B, C and D.
A-level/AS : A, B, C, D, and E
For Arab students one of the eight subjects should be Arabic language at either the O or A level. The following Arabic subjects are accepted for the equivalency:
Modern Arabic. 
First Language Arabic.
Arabic 9164.
The Ministry of Education will not accept the subject of Arabic as a Second Language for the equivalency purposes. It will consider acceptance if the student was enrolled in an English language medium school outside Jordan for the majority of his/her scholastic years. The Ministry will consider case by case to grant the equivalency.
In order to gain a Science Stream Tawjihi equivalency the following is needed
six subjects at the IGCSE or "O" level exams including:
two science subjects 
One subject Arabic language
two subjects at the A-level including:
Obligatory subject:
one full A-level Math, OR 
2 AS's mathematics, OR
A-level in physics
Optional subject:
a full A- level in any science, OR
2 AS's in two Sciences
Literary stream: to gain Tawjihi equivalency the following is needed:
six passes in IGCSE or “O” level exams including:
one subject in Mathematics
one subject in Computer Studies/Information Technology
two subjects at the A-level including:
Obligatory subject:
one full A-level must be in Arabic
Optional subject:
A full A-level in any literary subject or
two AS's in any two literary subjects or
one AS in a literary subject and one AS in a scientific subject.
At the advanced level Computing is considered a science subject. At the ordinary level Computer Studies and Information Technology are considered as science subjects.
Co-ordinated Science: for Tawjihi equivalency purposes the Ministry of Education has agreed to equate the Co-ordinated Science as two subjects.
AS levels:  The Ministry of Education has agreed that two AS subjects are equivalent to one A level for Tawjihi Equivalency purposes.  To receive an equivalency for a science subject the two AS subjects should be science subjects (i.e. AS Biology + AS Chemistry).  If one AS is a science subject and the other is a literary subject (i.e. AS Math. + AS Arabic) then it equals one A level towards the literary stream. The student should check with the university they are applying to whether they require a full A level or not.
The Ministry of Education will consider the same subject in two levels as two separate subjects (O level Biology and A level Biology). 
The candidate may re-sit the exam as many times as he/she needs before obtaining the equivalency.
Students may opt to take an extra full A Level on top of their other chosen subjects to raise their overall percentage. Their percentage increases depending on how much they get (for example, an A* raises your equivalency score by 1 percentage).

The final percentage of a score is calculated as follows:

A* = 100 C = 75

A = 95 D = 65

B = 85 E = 55

8 subject percentages(6GCSEs/IGCSEs, 2 A'level subjects) are added up and then the total is divided by 8.

International Baccalaureate Equivalency 
You should provide the Ministry with a proof that you have completed 12 years of schooling.
You should pass in 6 subjects. Passing grades are as follows:
Standard Level Subjects: 3-7
Higher Level Subjects: 4-7
Arab students do not have a special requirement.
In order to gain a Science Stream Tawjihi equivalency the following is needed:
2 Language subjects in either Group 1 or Group 2
1 Subject in either Group 3 or Group 6
2 Subjects from Group 4
1 Subject from Group 5
At least 2 of these subjects should be at Higher Level
In order to gain a Literary Stream Tawjihi equivalency the following is needed:
2 Language subjects in either Group 1 or Group 2
2 Subject in either Group 3 or Group 6
1 Subjects from Group 4
1 Subject from Group 5
At least 2 of these subjects should be at Higher Level
For The international baccalaureate the equivalency goes as follows:
Each subject is calculated individually then they are summed up and divided by 6, then a 0.3% is added for each point scored from the diploma program
A 7 is awarded a 98%,
A 6 is awarded a 90%,
A 5 is awarded an 80%,
A 4 is awarded a 70%,
A 3 is awarded a 60%
A 2 is awarded a 50%,
Keep in mind that a 2 is considered a fail and a 3 is considered a fail if it is in higher level.

An example of equivalency for a science stream student:
He obtained a score of 35. A 7 (98%) in Chemistry HL, a 6 (90%) in Physics SL, a 4 (70%) in ITGS SL, a 5 (80%) in Mathematics SL, a 5 (80%) in Arabic A1 SL, a 6 (90%) in English B SL and 2 marks from ToK and EE (0.3%×2=0.6%).
Here is the calculation:
 98+90+70+80+80+90=508,
 508 is then divided over 6=84.667,
 then 0.6 is added,
 the result is 85.27%.

See also

Education in Jordan

References

Education in Jordan
Education in the State of Palestine